Joan Manel Balcells Fornaguera (born 20 June 1975) is a retired professional tennis player from Spain. He won one ATP Tour singles title in his career and reached the final in Scottsdale in 2002  (losing to Andre Agassi) and the semifinals in 2000 Heineken Open losing to Michael Chang.

Balcells was born in Barcelona, and played for the Spain Davis Cup team in 2000, winning the doubles rubber (with Àlex Corretja) in the final against Australia. He retired in 2004. Ballcells was considered a strange player for being a Spanish player because Ballcells always go up to the net, his game was based on serve and volley. This was not very common on Spanish tennis by the 1990s and early 2000s.

ATP career finals

Singles: 2 (1 title, 1 runner-up)

Doubles: 2 (2 runners-up)

ATP Challenger and ITF Futures finals

Singles: 2 (0–2)

Doubles: 12 (6–6)

Performance timelines

Singles

Doubles

Top 10 wins

External links
 
 
 

1975 births
Living people
Tennis players from Catalonia
Spanish male tennis players
Tennis players from Barcelona